John Shine  (born 3 July 1946) is an Australian biochemist and molecular biologist. Shine and Lynn Dalgarno discovered the nucleotide sequence, called the Shine-Dalgarno sequence, necessary for the initiation and termination of protein synthesis. He directed the Garvan Institute of Medical Research in Sydney from 1990 to 2011. In May 2018 Shine was elected President of the Australian Academy of Science.

Background and early career
The brother of scientist, Richard Shine, John Shine was born in Brisbane in 1946 and completed his university studies at the Australian National University (ANU) in Canberra, graduating with a bachelor of science with honours in 1972 and completing his PhD in 1975. During the course of his studies he and his supervisor, Lynn Dalgarno, discovered the RNA sequence necessary for ribosome binding and the initiation of protein synthesis in the bacterium Escherichia coli. The sequence was named the Shine-Dalgarno sequence. This was a key discovery allowing further development of molecular biology, especially genetic engineering, and was an important discovery towards understanding gene expression and regulation.

Shine undertook post doctoral research at the Department of Biochemistry and Biophysics at the University of California, San Francisco (UCSF), during this period he was the first to clone a human hormone gene and was a central figure in the cloning of the insulin and growth hormone genes. He also determined the first sequence responsible for replication of a cancer causing virus.

Returning to Australia and the Australian National University in 1978, he cloned the human renin gene and cloned the endorphin gene, going on to demonstrate that human hormone genes cloned in bacteria could be expressed in a biologically active form. He also founded the Centre for Recombinant DNA Research at ANU. In 1982 he was awarded that Gottschalk Medal by the Australian Academy of Science.

Shine returned to the United States in 1984, taking a position at UCSF and directing a biotechnology company California Biotechnology Inc. He was instrumental in the development and growth of the company, now Scios, and subsequently sold to Johnson and Johnson.

He returned to Australia again in 1987 to take a professorship in molecular biology at the UNSW Australia and became the deputy director of the Garvan Institute. He was Chairman of the National Health and Medical Research Council from 2003–2006. He is currently a Professor of Medicine and Professor of Molecular Biology at Garvan Institute of Medical Research, Chairman of CSL Limited, and President of the Board of Museum of Applied Arts and Science ( Powerhouse Museum, Sydney Observatory).

Awards

In 1994 Shine was elected a Fellow of the Australian Academy of Science. He donated A$1 million to the Academy in 2000 to assist with funding the restoration of the building; subsequently renamed the Shine Dome in his honour.

Shine was appointed an Officer of the Order of Australia in 1996 for service to medical research, particularly in the field of molecular biology. In 2001 he was awarded a Centenary Medal "For service to Australian society and science in molecular genetics". In 2010, Shine was awarded the Prime Minister's Prize for Science, the nation's highest scientific award. In 2017 he was appointed a Companion of the Order of Australia.

In 2020 he was elected a Fellow of the Royal Society

References

Royal Society of New South Wales. 1130th General Monthly Meeting: Humanity's Future - Understanding our Genome, 2004

External links
Garvan Institute
Professor John Shine
Scios

1946 births
Living people
Australian biochemists
Australian geneticists
Companions of the Order of Australia
Fellows of the Australian Academy of Science
University of California, San Francisco faculty
Australian National University alumni
Academic staff of the University of New South Wales
Garvan Institute of Medical Research alumni
Recipients of the Centenary Medal
Australian Fellows of the Royal Society